Oregonia bifurca, commonly known as the split-nose crab or the split-nose decorator crab, is a species of crabs belonging to the family Oregoniidae. It is a rare deep-water species that inhabits the tops of seamounts and guyots in the northeastern Pacific Ocean; from the Aleutian Islands, the Bering Sea, the Hawaiian–Emperor seamount chain, to the waters off British Columbia. It is closely related to the more common shallow-water species Oregonia gracilis, the graceful decorator crab.

Like other majoid crabs, Oregonia bifurca are sexually dimorphic, with males larger than the females. The entire body and the long and slender legs are covered densely with curving yellow hair.

Taxonomy
Oregonia bifurca is one of the two extant species classified under the genus Oregonia, the other being the graceful decorator crab (Oregonia gracilis). It belongs to the family Oregoniidae under the superfamily Majoidea ("spider crabs"). It was first described by the American carcinologist Mary J. Rathbun in 1902.

Description
Oregonia bifurca are relatively small crabs. Like other members of Majoidea, they are sexually dimorphic.

The carapace is somewhat oblong in shape, about three-fourths as wide as it is long. It is slightly narrower at the anterior end. Two small spines are present at the posterior margin of eye orbit (the postorbital spines). The basal segments of the antennae are narrow and have small and stout forward-pointing spines, with smaller spines on the outer and inner margins. The rostrum is divided into two short, flat, and gradually tapering horns, hence the common name "split-nose". The upper and lower surfaces of the body covered densely with small protuberances (tubercles) with soft and long yellow hairs that curve at the tip. The abdomen (pleon) is composed of seven distinct segments.

The appendages of males are slender and covered with dense long yellow curving hairs interspersed with shorter and finer hairs. The claw-bearing legs (chelipeds, the first pereiopod pair) are much longer and somewhat elongated in males than they are in females. The arm (merus) of the chelipeds has two rows of spines on the inner margins, longer on the lower margin than on the upper margin. On the inner edge of the palm (manus) are four lengthwise rows of small spinules. The fixed finger (pollex) of the claw possesses a large tooth that fits into a groove in the movable finger (dactylus). They have a slight gape when closed fully, about two-fifths of the length from the base. They are about the same length as the palm. The chelipeds in males are usually slightly longer than the first pair of walking legs. The first pair of pleopods of the males are also enlarged at the tips and possess rows of long filaments.

The appendages of females are also covered in dense long yellow curving hairs interspersed with shorter and finer hairs. They are about one and a half times as long as the carapace. The arm of the chelipeds has a row of short blunt spines on the inner edge. The palm of the claws are about the same length as the fingers, and is slightly longer than the arm. The fixed finger and the moveable finger fit closely together and possess small teeth. The rest of the walking legs also decrease in length front-to-back, as in males.

Oregonia bifurca can be readily distinguished from O. gracilis in having shorter rostral horns that curve away from each other, triangular postorbital spines closer to the eyes and pointing more forward, a wider front end of the carapace, and long and slender dactyli on their walking legs. The tuberculation in O. bifurca is finer than in O. gracilis.

Distribution and habitat
They live at the surface of seamounts and guyots, in habitats of sand, broken shell, and foraminiferous mud.

O. bifurca is a rare species. Aside from the waters around the Aleutian Islands, it has also been documented in the Bowers Bank of the western Bering Sea, the Nintoku Seamount of the central Pacific Hawaiian–Emperor seamount chain, and off the coast of British Columbia in North America.

References

External links

Majoidea
Crustaceans of the eastern Pacific Ocean
Crustaceans described in 1902
Taxa named by Mary J. Rathbun